Emilio Rojas is an American rapper.

Biography

Early life and career beginnings
Emilio Rojas was born to a Venezuelan father and an American mother in the suburbs of Rochester. At age 10, Emilio's father left his family and returned to Venezuela, leaving Emilio and his family to fend for themselves. Despite this, Rojas has credited his father for sparking his interest in music.

Rojas graduated from The Harley School in 2002.

After making a name for himself as Raks One on Myspace, Rojas began taking his music much more seriously and decided to drop out of school to pursue a career in Hip Hop. In 2004 he made his first break through and began touring overseas with group Phocus, but by 2005 it was apparent to Emilio that not enough progress was being made in his career.

2005-2008
In 2005 Emilio took a car service to  New York City to focus solely on his music. Without hesitation he did and ended up in an illegally subdivided Brooklyn apartment. It was in New York where Rojas began to make a dent in the Hip Hop industry by rapping at open-mic nights in Brooklyn and elsewhere. Working with producers such as M-Phazes helped land him notoriety locally. By 2007 he began touring internationally again in places such as Venezuela and Europe.

2009-
Around 2008, mainstream producer DJ Green Lantern had noticed Rojas' music and began working with him on numerous projects such as 2010's Life Without Shame mixtape. Long anticipated "Breaking Point" was released on January 26, 2012, as a dual project with DJ Green Lantern. On June 11 his Mixtape No Shame No Regrets dropped.

Discography

Albums

Singles and extended plays 
According to Apple Music.

References

American male rappers
American people of Venezuelan descent
Hispanic and Latino American rappers
Living people
Musicians from Rochester, New York
Rappers from New York (state)
21st-century American rappers
21st-century American male musicians
Quakers (band) members
1984 births